John Hamer (born 5 April 1944) is an English former professional footballer who played as a left half.

Career
Born in Bradford, Hamer played for Bradford City and Harrogate Railway Athletic.

For Bradford City he made 1 appearance in the Football League.

Sources

References

1944 births
Living people
English footballers
Bradford City A.F.C. players
Harrogate Railway Athletic F.C. players
English Football League players
Association football wing halves